The New York Conservatory of Modern Music was a music school in New York City, founded soon after World War II by principal Alfred Francis Sculco, a professional trumpeter from Westerly, Rhode Island who attended the Juilliard School, and played with the big bands of Count Basie, Tommy Dorsey, Benny Goodman, and Harry James.

Located at 552 Atlantic Avenue in Brooklyn, it is notable for the alumni who went on to become working jazz musicians, including Jimmy Cheatham, Wally Cirillo, Seldon Powell, and George Tucker. Jazz record producer Don Schlitten is also a former student.

In addition to Sculco (affectionately known as "Squeak" by the students) and others, Tony Aless, Billy Bauer, Jim Chapin, and Don Lamond were all instructors at the college.

Notes

References 

Defunct private universities and colleges in New York (state)